is a railway station in Yoshijima-Yaguracho, Fushimi-ku, Kyoto, Japan, operated by the private railway operator Keihan Electric Railway.

Lines
Chushojima Station is served by the Keihan Main Line and the Keihan Uji Line.

Layout
The station has two side platforms and an island platform, serving a total of four tracks. There is an entrance on each side platform (north entrance: in the west of the side platform to take trains for Demachiyanagi, south entrance: in the west of the side platform used in the early morning for trains for Uji).

Platforms

Adjacent stations

History

The station opened on 15 April 1910.

Passenger statistics
In fiscal 2011, the station was used by an average of 12,691 passengers daily.

See also
 List of railway stations in Japan

References

External links

  
 Station map

Railway stations in Japan opened in 1910
Railway stations in Kyoto